Melaka City Football Club was a Malaysian professional football club based in Malacca City, Malacca. The team last played in the second division of Malaysian football, the Malaysia M3 League. Their home ground was Hang Tuah Stadium.

History
Melaka City FC filled the slot left by SAMB F.C. who withdrew from the M3 League.

Players (2020)

Season by season record

Notes:'

   2020 Season cancelled due to the 2020 Coronavirus Pandemic, no promotion or league title was awarded although this is now subject to a possible legal challenge

References

Malaysia M3 League
Football clubs in Malaysia